Derek Wilkinson is the name of:

Derek Wilkinson (footballer)
Derek Wilkinson (ice hockey)